The mitred parakeet (Psittacara mitratus), also known as the mitred conure in aviculture, is a species of green and red parrot in the family Psittacidae. It is native to the forests and woodlands in the Andes from north-central Peru, south through Bolivia, to north-western Argentina, with introduced populations in California, Florida and Hawaii. It may constitute a cryptic species complex.

Description

Adults are mainly green with varying amounts of red to the face and thighs, a relatively conspicuous bare white eye-ring, and a heavy, pale bone-coloured bill. Juveniles show little or no red to the plumage.

Unlike most of its relatives (scarlet-fronted, red-masked, white-eyed, Cuban, and Hispaniolan parakeet), adults at most show one or two red feathers at the bend of the wing.

Habitat and status
The introduced population in California primarily occurs in urban parks and residential areas. There are some seasonal movements in response to the availability of food. It is generally common to locally abundant, and when occasionally foraging in cultivated areas, it may cause considerable damage to crops. It is therefore considered to be of least concern by IUCN. The introduced Californian population had increased to c. 1000 birds by 2002, while the introduced population on Maui, despite attempts of eradication, had increased to c. 200 birds by 2003. Lethal control measures have been implemented by the Maui Invasive Species Committee and as of March 31, 2012 another five mitred parakeets were lethally removed from the wild and only 30 birds remain alive out of the initial 200. The high success rate of lethal removal suggests that mitred parakeets will be completely eliminated from Maui in the near future.

Behavior
It is social and typically seen in small flocks, but may gather in groups of up to 100 outside the breeding period. Exceptionally, flocks of up to 2000 may gather at roosting places. Breeds colonially on cliffs, and, in Argentina at least, sometimes in hollows in dead trees. It lays 2-3 eggs. In captivity, 3-4 eggs reported, and an incubation time of 23 days. It primarily feeds on seeds, nuts and fruits. The flight-call is a high ringing kerEET.

Taxonomy
The taxonomy has recently undergone significant changes with the description of two new subspecies, and the proposed elevation of the taxon alticola, traditionally considered a subspecies of the mitred parakeet, to species status as the Chapman's parakeet (P. alticola). Additionally, a new cryptic species from this complex has been described, the Hocking's parakeet (P. hockingi). These proposals have yet to receive widespread recognition, at least in part due to the problems involved in field identification of the new taxa and uncertainties regarding possible age-related variations. Recent work has been unable to confirm the differences upon which P. m. tucumana was described in 2006, leading to recommendations of treating it as a junior synonym of P. m. mitrata.

Traditional taxonomy:

 Psittacara mitrata:
 P. m. mitrata (nominate): Found in most of its range. Forecrown, lores and extensive mottling to face red.
 P. m. alticola: Found in the Cusco Region of Peru at higher altitudes than the nominate. Red virtually restricted to forecrown and lores, with little or no red mottling to face.

Taxonomy as proposed in 2006:

 Psittacara mitrata:
 P. m. mitrata (nominate): From the Peruvian region of Ayacucho, south through Bolivia, to the Salta Province in Argentina. Forecrown, lores and extensive mottling to face (mainly around eyes, though not forming complete eye-ring) red. Thighs red.
 P. m. chlorogenys: Found in the Peruvian regions of Amazonas, Cajamarca, Huánuco and Junín. Red of head virtually restricted to forecrown and lores, with little or no red mottling to face. Thighs red.
 P. m. tucumana: Found in the Argentinian provinces of Tucumán and Córdoba, and probably also in Catamarca and La Rioja. The introduced Californian population likely belongs to this subspecies. Forecrown and extensive mottling throughout face red. Mottling forms a complete eye-ring, and often also with a few random red specks to neck and chest. Thighs red.
 Psittacara alticola (proposed as monotypic species; Chapman's parakeet): Confirmed for the Peruvian regions of Huancavelica and Cusco, and the Bolivian department of Cochabamba. Red only to forecrown and lores, with few red feathers in the face. Thighs green.
 Psittacara hockingi (described as new monotypic species; Hocking's parakeet): Endemic to Peru in the regions of Amazonas, Ayacucho and Cuzco, and in central Peru in the Carpish mountains and adjacent ridge south of the upper Huallaga River. Relatively large red forecrown patch, but no red to face or lores. Thighs green.

Aviculture

The subspecies seen in American aviculture is Psittacara m. mitrata (though this is labelled with some uncertainty considering the recent developments in the taxonomy). Popular as pets, the mitred parakeets are considered outgoing and playful. They are even used as "watch birds", given their loud, piercing alarm call. Like most parrots, they tend to be devoted to their human owners. Though they have been known to grow attached to groups rather than individuals. They make great pets for people who will devote their time and money and will understand the birds natural behaviors; screaming, biting, splashing, etc.

References

External links

mitred parakeet
mitred parakeet
Birds of the Puna grassland
Birds of the Yungas
mitred parakeet
Taxonomy articles created by Polbot